Ponyo is a 2008 Japanese animated film.

Ponyo may also refer to:
 Ponyo, Lahe, a village in Myanmar
 Ponyo language, a language of Myanmar
 Matata Ponyo Mapon, Congolese political figure

See also 
 Poniou, a hamlet in England